Micraglossa nana is a moth in the family Crambidae. It was described by Wei-Chun Li, Hou-Hun Li and Matthias Nuss in 2010. It is found in China (Guizhou, Zhejiang, Guangxi) and Vietnam.

References

Moths described in 2010
Scopariinae